Shannon Colony is a census-designated place (CDP) and Hutterite colony in Miner County, South Dakota, United States. It was first listed as a CDP prior to the 2020 census. The population of the CDP was 1 at the 2020 census.

Demographics

References 

Census-designated places in Miner County, South Dakota
Census-designated places in South Dakota
Hutterite communities in the United States